Peter Andrew Bernstein (born September 3, 1967) is an American jazz guitarist.

Biography

Born in New York City on September 3, 1967, Bernstein began playing piano when he was eight but switched to guitar when he was thirteen, learning the instrument primarily by ear. He studied jazz at Rutgers University with Ted Dunbar, and Kenny Barron.

While a student at the New School in New York City, he met guitarist Jim Hall, who offered him a job performing at the JVC Jazz Festival in 1990. He then appeared on albums with Jesse Davis, Lou Donaldson, Larry Goldings, Michael Hashim, Geoff Keezer, and Melvin Rhyne. He released his first album as a leader with pianist Brad Mehldau. He has also worked with Jimmy Cobb, Tom Harrell, Diana Krall, Lee Konitz, Eric Alexander, Joshua Redman, Dr. Lonnie Smith, and Walt Weiskopf.

In 2008, Bernstein became part of the Blue Note 7, a septet formed that year in honor of the 70th anniversary of Blue Note Records. The group recorded the album Mosaic.

Peter throughout his career has played with Dr. Lonnie Smith, Nicholas Payton, Lee Konitz, Tom Harrell, Eric Alexander, Chuck Deardorf, Matt Jorgensen, Bill Stewart, Larry Goldings, Dario Chiazzolino, Gilad Hekselman and many others.

Bernstein plays a Zeidler archtop guitar almost exclusively. The guitar was made in 1981.

Discography

As leader
 Somethin's Burnin' (Criss Cross, 1994)
 Signs of Life (Criss Cross, 1995)
 Brain Dance (Criss Cross, 1996)
 April in New York (Jardis, 1998)
 Earth Tones with Larry Goldings, Bill Stewart (Criss Cross, 1998)
 We Remember Tal with Gene Bertoncini, Mundell Lowe, Jack Wilkins (J-Curve, 1999)
 Consenting Adults with M.T.B. (Criss Cross, 2000)
 Stranger in Paradise (Venus, 2003)
 Heart's Content (Criss Cross, 2003)
 Guitars Alone with Satoshi Inoue (What'sNew, 2003)
 You'll See with the Anniversary Quartet (Cellar Live, 2005)
 In Orbit with Planet Jazz (Sharp Nine, 2006)
 Monk (Xanadu, 2008)
 Peter Bernstein Quartet: Live at Smalls (SmallsLIVE, 2008)
 Live at Smalls with Planet Jazz (Off Minor, 2010)
 Live at Smalls with Larry Goldings, Bill Stewart (SmallsLIVE, 2011)
 Dialogues with Joachim Schoenecker (2012)
 Live at Cory Weeds' Cellar Jazz Club with the Tilden Webb Trio (Cellar Live, 2013)
 Solo Guitar Live at Smalls (SmallsLIVE, 2013)
 Ramshackle Serenade with Larry Goldings, Bill Stewart (Pirouet, 2014)
 Inspired with Rale Micic, John Abercrombie, Lage Lund (ArtistShare, 2016)
 Humanity with the Humanity Quartet (Cellar Live, 2016)
 Let Loose (Smoke Sessions, 2016)
 Signs Live! (Smoke Sessions, 2017)
 Toy Tunes with Larry Goldings, Bill Stewart (Pirouet, 2018)
 What Comes Next (Smoke Sessions, 2020)

As sideman
With Eric Alexander
 Tell It Like It Is (Criss Cross, 1994)
 Full Range (Criss Cross, 1995)
 Aztec Blues (Criss Cross, 1997)
 Alexander the Great (HighNote, 2000)

With Jimmy Cobb
 Only for the Pure of Heart (Fable, 1998)
 Cobb's Groove (Milestone, 2003)
 The Original Mob (Smoke Sessions, 2014)
 This I Dig of You (Smoke Sessions, 2019)

With Lou Donaldson
 Play the Right Thing (Milestone, 1991)
 Birdseed (Milestone, 1992)
 Caracas (Milestone, 1994)
 Sentimental Journey  (Columbia, 1995)

With Larry Goldings
 Intimacy of the Blues (Minor Music, 1991)
 Light Blue (Minor Music, 1992)
 Caminhos Cruzados (Novus, 1994)
 Whatever It Takes (Warner Bros., 1995)
 Big Stuff (Warner Bros., 1996)
 Moonbird (Palmetto, 1999)
 As One (Palmetto, 2000)
 Sweet Science (Palmetto, 2002)
 Long Story Short (Sticky Mack, 2007)

With Mike LeDonne
 Waltz for an Urbanite (Criss Cross, 1996)
 Smokin' Out Loud (Savant, 2004)
 On Fire (Savant, 2007)
 The Groover (Savant, 2009)
 I Love Music (Savant, 2014)
 AwwlRIGHT! (Savant, 2015)
 That Feelin (Savant, 2016)
 From the Heart (Savant, 2018)

With Melvin Rhyne
 The Legend (Criss Cross, 1992)
 Boss Organ (Criss Cross, 1994)
 Stick to the Kick (Criss Cross, 1995)
 Mel's Spell (Criss Cross, 1996)
 Kojo (Criss Cross, 1997)
 Classmasters (Criss Cross, 1999)
 Tomorrow Yesterday Today (Criss Cross, 2003)

With Lonnie Smith
 Too Damn Hot (Palmetto, 2004)
 Jungle Soul (Palmetto, 2006)
 Rise Up! (Palmetto, 2008)
 The Art of Organizing (Criss Cross, 2009)

With Grant Stewart
 More Urban Tones (Criss Cross, 1996)
 Shadow of Your Smile (Birds, 2007)
 Around the Corner (Sharp Nine, 2010)

With Sam Yahel
 Searchin (Naxos, 1997)
 In the Blink of an Eye (Naxos, 1999)
 Trio (Criss Cross, 1999)

With others
 Harry Allen, Christmas in Swingtime (BMG, 2001) – recorded in 2000
 Ehud Asherie, Organic (Posi-Tone, 2010)
 Teodross Avery, My Generation (Impulse!, 1996)
 Pat Bianchi, In the Moment (Savant, 2018)
 Bob Belden, When Doves Cry (Metro Blue, 1994)
 Ralph Bowen, Soul Proprietor (Criss Cross, 2001)
 Ralph Bowen, Five (Criss Cross, 2008)
 Bubba Brooks, Smooth Sailing (TCB, 1997)
 LaVerne Butler, Day Dreamin (Chesky, 1994)
 Igor Butman, Sheherazade's Tales (Butman Music 2011)
 Ron Carter, In Memory of Jim (Somethin' Else, 2014)
 Bill Charlap, I'm Old Fashioned (Venus, 2010)
 George Coleman, A Master Speaks (Smoke Sessions, 2016)
 Jesse Davis, As We Speak (Concord Jazz, 1992)
 Jesse Davis, Young at Art (Concord Jazz, 1993)
 Steve Davis, Vibe Up! (Criss Cross, 1998)
 Steve Davis, Update (Criss Cross, 2006)
 Trudy Desmond, Make Me Rainbows (Koch, 1995)
 Klaus Doldinger, Back in New York Blind Date (WEA, 1999)
 Renee Fleming, Christmas in New York (Decca, 2014)
 Fleurine, Fire (Coast to Coast, 2002)
 Don Friedman, Waltz for Marilyn (Jazz Excursion, 2007)
 Don Friedman, Remembering Attila Zoller (Edition Longplay, 2016)
 Jon Gordon, The Things We Need (Double-Time, 1999)
 Wycliffe Gordon, Dig This! (Criss Cross, 2002)
 Jim Hall, Jim Hall and Friends Live at Town Hall Vol. 1 (Musicmasters, 1991)
 Jim Hall, Jim Hall and Friends Live at Town Hall Vol. 2 (Musicmasters, 1991)
 Bill Heid, Wylie Avenue (Doodlin' 2009)
 Ian Hendrickson-Smith, Still Smokin (Sharp Nine, 2004)
 Bobby Hutcherson, Somewhere in the Night (Kind of Blue 2012)
 Etta Jones, Sings Lady Day (HighNote, 2001)
 Geoffrey Keezer, Other Spheres (DIW, 1993)
 Nancy Kelly, B That Way (BlueBay, 2014)
 Ryan Kisor, Battle Cry (Criss Cross, 1998)
 Ryan Kisor, Donna Lee (Videoarts, 2004)
 Lee Konitz, Parallels (Chesky, 2001)
 Doug Lawrence, High Heel Sneakers (Fable/Lightyear 1998)
 Brian Lynch, At the Main Event (Criss Cross, 1993)
 Harold Mabern, Afro Blue (Smoke Sessions, 2015)
 Kevin Mahogany, Kevin Mahogany (Warner Bros., 1996)
 Jane Monheit, The Lovers, The Dreamers and Me (Concord 2008)
 David "Fathead" Newman, Life (HighNote, 2007)
 David "Fathead" Newman, The Blessing (HighNote, 2009)
 Ben Paterson, For Once in My Life (Origin, 2015)
 Nicholas Payton, Dear Louis (Verve, 2001)
 Alvin Queen, I Ain't Looking at You (Enja, 2006)
 Alvin Queen, Mighty Long Way (Enja, 2009)
 Joshua Redman, Freedom in the Groove (Warner Bros., 1996)
 Joshua Redman, Momentum (Nonesuch, 2005)
 Sonny Rollins, Road Shows Vol. 3 (Doxy/Okeh 2014)
 Sonny Rollins, Road Shows Vol. 4: Holding the Stage (Doxy/Okeh 2016)
 Jorge Rossy, Stay There (Pirouet, 2016)
 Jim Rotondi, New Vistas (Criss Cross, 2004)
 Anton Schwartz, Radiant Blue (Anton Jazz, 2006)
 Seatbelts, Cowboy Bebop: Vitaminless (Victor, 1998)
 Janis Siegel, Friday Night Special (Telarc, 2003)
 Gary Smulyan, Mike LeDonne, Kenny Washington, Smul's Paradise (Capri, 2012)
 Wendy Waldman, Wendy Waldman (Warner Bros., 1975)
 Walt Weiskopf, A World Away (Criss Cross, 1995)
 Paula West, Come What May (Hi Horse, 2001)

References

External links 
Official site

1967 births
American jazz guitarists
Living people
Rutgers University alumni
The New School alumni
Guitarists from New York City
20th-century American guitarists
Jazz musicians from New York (state)
The Blue Note 7 members
Pirouet Records artists
Criss Cross Jazz artists
Smoke Sessions Records artists